From Out of Nowhere is the debut album by Australian guitarist Tommy Emmanuel that was released in 1979. The album features pedal steel guitarist Pee Wee Clark.

Background
By the late 1970s, Emmanuel had made a name for himself in Sydney. His guitar work appeared in commercials and on Australian pop records, including "Lost in Love" by Air Supply.  Emmanuel recorded his first solo album From Out of Nowhere in 1979.

Track listing

Personnel
 Tommy Emmanuel – guitar
 Pee Wee Clark – pedal steel guitar
 Ken Francis – rhythm guitar
 Mark Collins – banjo
 Mack Clark – bass
 Rodney Ford – drums

References

1979 debut albums
Tommy Emmanuel albums
Covers albums